Aethes flagellana is a species of moth of the  family Tortricidae. It is found on Corsica, Sardinia, Sicily and Crete and in the Netherlands, France, Spain, Italy, Germany, Austria, Switzerland, the Czech Republic, Slovakia, Slovenia, Poland, Albania, Hungary, Bulgaria, Romania, North Macedonia, Greece, Lithuania, Ukraine, Russia and Asia Minor, Lebanon, Iran and the Kopet Dagh mountains.

Adults are on wing in March and from June to July.

The larvae feed on Eryngium campestre. Larvae can be found from August to May.

Subspecies
Aethes flagellana flagellana
Aethes flagellana atlasi Razowski, 1962
Aethes flagellana sardoa (Amsel, in Hartig & Amsel, 1952) (Sardinia)

References

External links

Lepiforum.de

flagellana
Moths described in 1836
Moths of Europe
Moths of Asia
Taxa named by Philogène Auguste Joseph Duponchel